She is a 1917 American silent fantasy adventure drama film directed by Kenean Buel and produced and distributed by the Fox Film Corporation. It was loosely based on H. Rider Haggard's oft filmed 1887 best-selling novel, She: A History of Adventure. Now considered lost, the film starred Valeska Suratt and Ben Taggart.

Cast
 Valeska Suratt as Ayesha, 'She'
 Ben Taggart as Leo Vincey
 Miriam Fouche as Ustane
 Thomas Wigney Persyval as Billali
 Tom Burrough as Horace Holly
 Martin Reagan as Job

See also
1937 Fox vault fire
List of Fox Film films

References

External links

She at silentera.com
Scene from the now lost film (University of Washington, Sayre collection)

1917 films
1910s adventure drama films
1910s fantasy adventure films
Fox Film films
American adventure drama films
American fantasy adventure films
Films directed by Kenean Buel
American silent feature films
American black-and-white films
Films based on British novels
Lost American films
Films based on She
1917 drama films
1910s English-language films
1910s American films
Silent American drama films
Silent adventure drama films